Jesse Creek is a stream in Audrain and Callaway counties in the U.S. state of Missouri. It is a tributary of Beaverdam Creek.

Jesse Creek has the name of Scott Jesse, an early settler.

References

Rivers of Audrain County, Missouri
Rivers of Callaway County, Missouri
Rivers of Missouri